The Star (XVII) is the 17th ranking or Major Arcana card in most traditional tarot decks. It is used in game playing as well as in divination.

Description 

A naked woman kneels by the water; one foot is in the water and one foot is on the land. Above her head is one large star, representing her core essences, and seven smaller stars, representing the chakras.  In each hand she holds a jug. From one jug she pours a liquid into the water. From the other jug she pours a liquid onto the land.

The Star represents: New hopes and splendid revelations of the future, insight, inspiration, courage and enlightenment of the spiritual self. Body and mind and converging towards the light at the end of a dark time(s). Another reading says Yes, hope and bright prospects; reversed (something opposed to the original demiurge impulse, the inner all-embracing meaning of the card) -- loss, theft, privation, hubris, abandonment, arrogance, haughtiness, impotence.

According to A.E. Waite's 1910 book The Pictorial Key to the Tarot, the Star card carries several divinatory associations:

17.THE STAR.--Hope and bright prospects, Reversed: Loss, theft, privation, abandonment; another reading says: arrogance, haughtiness, impotence.

In astrology, the Star card is associated with the planet Uranus and Aquarius zodiac sign.

In other media
In the manga JoJo's Bizarre Adventure: Stardust Crusaders, tarot cards are used to name some of the characters' powers, named 'Stands'. The protagonist of Stardust Crusaders, Jotaro Kujo, has a Stand named Star Platinum, named after The Star card.

References
 A. E. Waite's 1910 Pictorial Key to the Tarot
Juliette Wood, Folklore 109 (1998): 15–24, "The Celtic Tarot and the Secret Tradition: A Study in Modern Legend Making" (1998)

External links

Major Arcana